Dorcadion micans is a species of beetle in the family Cerambycidae. It was described by Thomson in 1867. It is known from Turkey.

Subspecies
 Dorcadion micans micans Thomson, 1867
 Dorcadion micans susheriense Breuning, 1970

References

micans
Beetles described in 1867